The 35th Guam Legislature was the meeting of the Guam Legislature that was convened in Hagatna, Guam on January 7, 2019 and ended on January 3, 2021, during the first and second years of Lou Leon Guerrero's Governorship.

In the 2018 Guam election, the Democratic Party of Guam won a supermajority. This is the first supermajority Guam Legislature since the 30th Guam Legislature. This legislature is the first to have a female supermajority.

Party Summary

Leadership

Legislative
 Speaker: Tina Muna Barnes
 Vice Speaker: Telena Cruz Nelson
 Legislative Secretary: Amanda Shelton

Majority (Democratic)
 Majority Leader: Telena Cruz Nelson
 Assistant Majority Leader: Kelly Marsh Taitano
 Majority Whip: Amanda Shelton
 Assistant Majority Whip: Regine Biscoe Lee

Minority (Republican)
 Minority Leader: Wil Castro
 Assistant Minority Leader: Louise Borja Muna
 Minority Whip: Telo Taitague
 Assistant Minority Whip: James Moylan

Membership

Committees

References 

Legislature of Guam
Politics of Guam
Political organizations based in Guam